Superman: The Game is a 1985 video game designed by Fernando Herrera and published in the U.S. by First Star Software for the Commodore 64. For European release, Superman was ported the Acorn Electron, Amstrad CPC, Atari 8-bit family, BBC Micro, and ZX Spectrum.

Gameplay

The game is for 2 players (or 1 vs the computer) and pits Superman against the character Darkseid. The object of the game is to save citizens of Metropolis (playing as Superman), or lure them to an underground lair (playing as Darkseid).

The game area is split into six sectors; 3 in the streets of Metropolis and 3 underground. Frantic citizens are running around the city and can be directed by deflectors (which can be set in certain directions) or by using super powers (Superman can pick up and carry citizens, Darkseid can teleport them). The players cannot leave a sector until they collect a diamond (or a number of diamonds depending on the difficulty setting). They then get to choose which sector to move to. In between each sector is a 'combat zone' mini-game These come in a variety of styles. If the player who chose to leave the sector wins, the game moves on to the chosen sector. If they lose, play returns to the previous sector. In the sectors, the players can fire beams of set lengths (Superman uses heat vision, Darkseid fires an omega ray). If they hit, the enemy loses energy and also drops any diamonds collected. These beams are also directed by the deflectors.

The game ends when there are no more citizens running around or one of the players' energy bars is fully drained. The winner is the player who has saved (or lured) the most citizens at this point.

Release
Originally released in 1985 for the Commodore 64 in the US by developer First Star Software, it was picked up in the UK by Beyond Software. Beyond also advertised conversions for the ZX Spectrum, Amstrad CPC and Atari 8-bit family but not all of them made it to release. Telecomsoft released the Spectrum version for the first time at a budget price in 1986. In 1987 Prism Leisure Corporation published the game. This included all of the previous versions as well as new conversions for the Commodore 16/Plus/4, BBC Micro and Acorn Electron. The new conversions did not contain the combat zones.

References

External links
Superman: The Game at Lemon64
Superman: The Game at World of Spectrum
Superman: The Game at Atari Mania

1985 video games
Action video games
Amstrad CPC games
Atari 8-bit family games
BBC Micro and Acorn Electron games
Commodore 16 and Plus/4 games
Commodore 64 games
First Star Software games
Multiplayer and single-player video games
Scrolling shooters
Superhero video games
Superman video games
Telecomsoft games
Video games developed in the United States
Video games set in the United States
ZX Spectrum games